The Don Dorrigo Gazette, previously published as the Don Dorrigo Gazette and Guy Fawkes Advocate, is a weekly English language newspaper published in Dorrigo, New South Wales, Australia.

History 
The newspaper was established as the Don Dorrigo and Guy Fawkes Advocate on 8 January 1910 by brothers Roy and Reginald Vincent.

Production 
The paper continues to be produced by a hot-metal typesetting, printed on a Heidelberg Zylinder Automat press, and is the last known newspaper in Australia to be produced by these means. Its current editors are Michael and Jade English who in around 2006, took over from Michael's father John who had been working for the newspaper since 1961.

Quotes 
Articles from the Gazette have been quoted in other regional newspapers:
 "The Only Hope". Daily Observer (Tamworth, NSW : 1917 - 1920), 8 May 1920, p. 1.
 "Capitalists and 'Chickenguzzlers'". The Gloucester Advocate, 1 April 1922, p. 1.
 "Why Import Timber to Australia?". Bunyip, (Gawler, SA : 1863 - 1954), 11 November 1949, p. 4.

Digitisation 
The paper has been digitised as part of the Australian Newspapers Digitisation Program of the National Library of Australia.

See also 
 List of newspapers in Australia
 List of newspapers in New South Wales

References

External links 
 
 Pictures: The Don Dorrigo Gazette Shows Off Its Pre-WW2 Press. (3 Mar 2010), ProPrint.

Defunct newspapers published in New South Wales
Newspapers on Trove